Conway Maurice Berners-Lee (19 September 1921 – 1 February 2019) was an English mathematician and computer scientist who worked as a member of the team that developed the Ferranti Mark 1, the world's first commercial stored program electronic computer. He was born in Birmingham in 1921 and was the father of Sir Tim Berners-Lee, the inventor of the World Wide Web, and Professor Mike Berners-Lee, researcher into climate change.

Early and personal life
Berners-Lee was son of Major Cecil Burford Berners-Lee (1884–1931), of the Royal Field Artillery, and Helen Lane Campbell Gray (1895–1968). His mother was from Winnipeg, Manitoba, daughter of John Sidney Gray, M.D.

Berners-Lee died in February 2019 at the age of 97.

Career
Early in World War II whilst an undergraduate at Trinity College, Cambridge reading mathematics, Berners-Lee volunteered for the armed services, but was instructed to stay on to take parts I and II of the mathematical tripos as a compressed two-year course, because the government needed people trained in mathematics and electronics. In addition, he attended a series of lectures in electronics. After university, he had further training in electronic engineering and soon joined the army in the Corps of Royal Electrical and Mechanical Engineers (REME). He worked on Gun Laying and Searchlight Radar in England.

After the end of hostilities, Berners-Lee was posted to Egypt where he encountered Maurice Kendall's book The Advanced Theory of Statistics, which greatly impressed him. He then had a chance to join the statistics bureau in the GHQ in Cairo, known as the Number 1 Statistics Unit of the Royal Army Ordnance Corps. He was employed to close down a very large punched card installation involving about five million 65-column punched cards covering all types of vehicle and spares. This meant that they had to say goodbye to 30 women who had been punching the cards. The last job was sorting and listing the 250,000 personnel cards to get all the service people onto ships for home. There was a race with the clerks doing this job by hand—and the clerks won over the machines.

Berners-Lee was demobilised in 1947 with the rank of Major. He then worked on a punched card data processing system for the Plastics Division of Imperial Chemical Industries (ICI). He met his wife Mary Lee Woods at the Ferranti Christmas party in Manchester in 1952. She had been working as a programmer on the Ferranti Mark 1 and Mark 1 Star computers at the Department of Computer Science, University of Manchester since 1951. He joined Ferranti in 1953 working at Ferranti's London Computer Centre. They were married on 10 July 1954 at St Saviour's Church, Hampstead.

The following is an extract from Dominic Wilson's book Organizational Marketing.

In the 1950s it was not clear how computers could usefully be employed away from the field of mathematics. As well as statistics, Berners-Lee had acquired a knowledge of operations research (OR), and he showed himself to be good at devising worthwhile computer applications. He directed the development of routines for the basic data processing techniques of sorting and updating files. In 1956 he devised an application for planning the production of items from a variety of components, for example, animal feed products. In 1957 he published an article on machine loading. A report that he produced in 1964 listed 31 Ferranti projects that used OR techniques in a wide variety of businesses.

The business computing division of Ferranti was merged with International Computers and Tabulators (ICT) in 1963, and ICT was, in turn, merged with English Electric Leo Marconi (EELM) computers in 1968 to form International Computers Limited (ICL).

In 1960 Berners-Lee had evolved a technique for editing text—including hyphenation—for metal typesetting of printed material. As space in memory and backing store was a scarce and valuable resource in those days, he had also devised a procedure for compressing text, which in 1963 he sent to Bob Bemer at Univac.

In the late 1960s Berners-Lee led the Medical Development Team of ICT and then ICL. He was involved in some of the earliest developments in the applications of computers in medicine, and his text compression ideas were taken up by an early electronic patient record system.

Berners-Lee spent the 1970s developing and using a queuing network model for ICL's 'New Range' of computers (later the ICL 2900 Series) with Dr John Pinkerton who was responsible for optimising the price/performance of the new systems. It was known as FAST – standing for Football Analogy for System Throughput. The work done by each 'player' was derived from a system monitor file containing data for device and concurrency counts. He received much encouragement when Hughes and Moe at Norwegian University of Science and Technology, Trondheim, predicted the effect of increasing the memory on their Univac Installation. The model could also be used to predict throughput on a minute to minute basis – peaks being believed to be due to instability in the operating system. He retired in 1986.

References

External links
 The National Archives: The Ferranti Collection including:
 Linear Programming "Arrives". By Dr. D.G. Prinz & Mr C.M Berners-Lee of Ferranti Ltd. (Paper) 1996.10/6/12/28/10 1957
 The Use of Electronic Computers in the Chemical Industry. By C.M. Berners-Lee 1996.10/6/12/28/28 1959
 The Use of Computers for Optimal Planning. By C.M. Berners-Lee 1996.10/6/12/28/29 1959
 Photograph with colleagues (under Ferranti and ICL)
 An interview with Conway Berners-Lee from the British Library

1921 births
2019 deaths
Military personnel from Birmingham, West Midlands
20th-century English mathematicians
21st-century English mathematicians
Alumni of Trinity College, Cambridge
English computer scientists
Ferranti
International Computers Limited people
People from Birmingham, West Midlands
Royal Electrical and Mechanical Engineers soldiers
People associated with the Department of Computer Science, University of Manchester
British Army personnel of World War II
Royal Army Ordnance Corps soldiers